StrikeIron provided a cloud-based Data Quality Suite including email verification, address verification, phone validation, phone append, and sales tax calculation solutions. The company was based in Research Triangle Park, N.C. It was founded by Bob Brauer (founder of DataFlux), Richard Holcomb (co-founder of HAHT Software and Q+E Software), and Robert Dale in 2003. StrikeIron was a leader in Data-as-a-Service with its delivery platform IronCloud.

The company has raised over $16 million USD in venture funding. It was financially backed by Ascent Ventures, The Aurora Funds, and NC IDEA. It was acquired by Informatica in June 2014.

Prior to the acquisition, the CEO of the company was Sean O'Leary.

History
The company was based in Research Triangle Park, N.C. It was founded by Bob Brauer (founder of DataFlux), Richard Holcomb (co-founder of HAHT Software and Q+E Software), and Robert Dale in 2003.

The early vision of the company was to provide products that would help programmers and analysts to find web services. During the company's initial launch, StrikeIron offered its first product, the Web Services Analyzer. This software product was developed to provide fast analysis and understanding of web service offerings. The Analyzer located and generated graphically the data requirements, functionality and applicability for web services.

In 2004, the company decided to focus on developing a Web service delivery platform and started writing Web services of its own, resulting in the launch of an address verification Web service.

In 2005, StrikeIron rolled out the Web Services Marketplace, the world's largest online marketplace dedicated to commercial Web services. The Web Services Marketplace brought together a community of providers and users to buy and sell Web services subscriptions. StrikeIron also released a desktop-based premium version of the Analyzer that allowed users to easily browse through both internal and external directories. It included direct access to the StrikeIron Web Services Marketplace. Users could quickly and easily understand the data structures, data requirements, behavior and results of a Web service and select the right Web service for their needs without any programming or any additional software. The Web Services Marketplace greatly simplified the selling and buying of Web services for a broad audience of providers and users.

Later in 2005, StrikeIron released more of its own Web services like sales tax and SMS solutions. The product portfolio continued to grow in 2006 with the addition of email verification, zip code information, and financial data services.

In 2006, Gartner named StrikeIron a "Cool Vendor" in B2B Integration. Forrester Research also named StrikeIron as a "Hot Company to Watch."

In 2009, StrikeIron narrowed product portfolio to data quality and data communication solutions. The company was selected as one of AlwaysOn's Global 250 Top Private Companies.

Today, StrikeIron remains the leader in Data-as-a-Service. It was the first DaaS company in the Cloud.

In 2012, StrikeIron won the "Cloud Computing Company of the Year" award, along with an award for best cloud infrastructure, at the inaugural Cloud Awards program.

In 2014, StrikeIron was acquired by Informatica

References

Notes
 Top 10 Venture Capital Deals in Q1 by Phil Goldstein, Fierce Wireless June 23, 2009

External links
 

Software companies based in North Carolina
Companies established in 2003
Defunct software companies of the United States